The 42nd Filmfare Awards were held on 23 February 1997, in Mumbai, India.

Khamoshi: The Musical led the ceremony with 13 nominations, followed by Maachis and Raja Hindustani with 10 nominations.

Khamoshi: The Musical and Raja Hindustani won 5 awards each, thus becoming the most-awarded films at the ceremony, with the former winning Best Film (Critics) (for Sanjay Leela Bhansali) and Best Actress (Critics) (for Manisha Koirala), and the latter winning Best Film, Best Actor (for Aamir Khan) and Best Actress (for Karisma Kapoor).

Nana Patekar received dual nominations for Best Actor for his performances in Agni Sakshi and Khamoshi: The Musical, but lost to Aamir Khan who won the award for Raja Hindustani.

Main awards

Best Film
 Raja Hindustani 
Agni Sakshi
Bandit Queen
Khamoshi: The Musical
Maachis

Best Director
 Shekhar Kapoor – Bandit Queen 
Dharmesh Darshan – Raja Hindustani
Gulzar – Maachis
Partho Ghosh – Agni Sakshi
Rajkumar Santoshi – Ghatak: Lethal

Best Actor
 Aamir Khan – Raja Hindustani 
Govinda – Saajan Chale Sasural
Nana Patekar – Agni Sakshi
Nana Patekar – Khamoshi: The Musical
Sunny Deol – Ghatak: Lethal

Best Actress
 Karisma Kapoor – Raja Hindustani 
Juhi Chawla – Daraar
Manisha Koirala – Khamoshi: The Musical
Seema Biswas – Bandit Queen
Tabu – Maachis

Best Supporting Actor
 Amrish Puri – Ghatak: Lethal 
Anupam Kher – Chaahat
Jackie Shroff – Agni Sakshi
Om Puri – Maachis
Salman Khan – Jeet

Best Supporting Actress
 Rekha – Khiladiyon Ka Khiladi 
Archana Puran Singh – Raja Hindustani
Helen – Khamoshi: The Musical
Seema Biswas – Khamoshi: The Musical
Tabu – Jeet

Best Comedian
 Satish Kaushik – Saajan Chale Sasural 
Johnny Lever – Raja Hindustani
Kader Khan – Saajan Chale Sasural
Navneet Nishan – Raja Hindustani
Shakti Kapoor – Loafer

Best Villain
 Arbaaz Khan – Daraar 
Ashish Vidyarthi – Is Raat Ki Subah Nahin
Danny Denzongpa – Ghatak: Lethal
Milind Gunaji – Fareb
Naseeruddin Shah – Chaahat

Best Music Director 
 Raja Hindustani – Nadeem-Shravan 
Khamoshi: The Musical – Jatin–Lalit
Maachis – Vishal Bhardwaj
Papa Kehte Hai – Rajesh Roshan
Tere Mere Sapne – Viju Shah

Best Lyricist
 Papa Kehte Hai – Javed Akhtar for Ghar Se Nikalte Hi 
Is Raat Ki Subah Nahin – Nida Fazli for Jeevan Kya Hai
Khamoshi: The Musical – Majrooh Sultanpuri for Aaj Main Upar
Maachis – Gulzar for Chappa Chappa
Raja Hindustani – Sameer for Pardesi Pardesi

Best Playback Singer, Male
 Raja Hindustani – Udit Narayan for Pardesi Pardesi 
Diljale – Udit Narayan for Ho Nahin Sakta
Fareb – Abhijeet for Yeh Teri Aankhen Jhuki Jhuki
Maachis – Hariharan and Suresh Wadkar for Chappa Chappa
Papa Kehte Hai – Udit Narayan for Ghar Se Nikalte Hi

Best Playback Singer, Female
 Khamoshi: The Musical – Kavita Krishnamurthy for Aaj Main Upar 
Agni Sakshi – Kavita Krishnamurthy for O Yaara Dil Lagana
Khamoshi: The Musical – Alka Yagnik for Baahon Ke Darmiyaan
Raja Hindustani – Alka Yagnik for Pardesi Pardesi

Best Debut, Male
 Chandrachur Singh – Maachis

Best Debut, Female
 Seema Biswas – Bandit Queen

Best Story
 Maachis – Gulzar 
 Agni Sakshi – Ranbir Pushp

Best Screenplay
 Ghatak: Lethal – Rajkumar Santoshi 
 Agni Sakshi – Ranbir Pushp

Best Dialogue
 Maachis – Gulzar

Best Action
 Khiladiyon Ka Khiladi

Best Cinematography
 Bandit Queen

Best Editing
 Ghatak: Lethal

Best Choreography
 Rakshak – Chinni Prakash for Sheher Ki Ladki

Best Art Direction
 Khamoshi: The Musical

Best Sound
 Khamoshi: The Musical

Special awards

Lifetime Achievement Award
 Dharmendra and Mumtaz

Special Award
 Govinda, Nasir Hussain, Pran and Shobhna Samarth

R. D. Burman Award
 Vishal Bhardwaj – Maachis

Critics' awards

Best Film
 Khamoshi: The Musical

Best Actress
 Manisha Koirala – Khamoshi: The Musical

Best Documentary
 Beyond the Himalayas

Biggest winners
Khamoshi: The Musical – 5/13
Raja Hindustani – 5/11
Maachis – 4/11
Ghatak: Lethal – 3/6
Bandit Queen – 3/5

References

 https://www.imdb.com/event/ev0000245/1997

See also
 Filmfare Awards
 43rd Filmfare Awards

Filmfare Awards
Filmfare